The Nine Lives of Marion Barry is a 2009 HBO documentary about the life of American politician Marion Barry.  The film was scored by musicians Erik Blicker and Glenn Schloss.

Contributors

Ivan Donaldson, former deputy Mayor
Jesse Jackson, activist
Adrienne Washington, The Washington Times
Marshall Brown, political advisor
Lawrence Guyot, civil rights activist
Gerald Bruce Lee, United States District Judge
Carroll Harvey, PRIDE co-founder
George Pelecanos, writer
Max Barry, political advisor
Effi Barry, ex-wife
Jim Vance, journalist
Bruce Johnson, journalist
Maurice Jackson, Georgetown professor
Bill Regardie, magazine publisher
Bruce Brown, filmmaker
Jonetta Rose-Barras, author
Tom Sherwood, journalist
Harry Jaffe, journalist
Michael Fauntroy, GWU professor
Jonathan Agronsky
Rock Newman, boxing promoter and activist

References

External links

 at HBO Films
 at IndiePix Films

2009 films
American documentary films
Documentary films about American politicians
2000s English-language films
2000s American films